Holtec International is a supplier of equipment and systems for the energy industry founded in Mount Laurel, New Jersey and based in Jupiter, Florida, United States. It specializes in the design and manufacture of parts for nuclear reactors. The company sells equipment to manage spent nuclear fuel from nuclear reactors.

In July 2014, the New Jersey Economic Development Authority awarded Holtec International a $260 million tax incentive to expand operations at the Port of Camden. Those breaks have come under scrutiny.

Holtec makes storage casks used for spent nuclear fuel. It intends to send spent fuel to a site in New Mexico, but has met with resistance.

Holtec is scheduled to purchase Indian Point Energy Center from Entergy and decommission it starting in 2021.

SMR-160
The Holtec Inherently Safe Modular Underground Reactor SMR-160 is a design of a 160 MWe pressurized water reactor (PWR) small modular reactor.

In February 2018, GE Hitachi Nuclear Energy agreed to collaborate on the commercialization of the design. In 2020 an agreement was made to use Framatome commercially available 17x17 GAIA fuel assembly in the SMR-160.

As of 2020, the SMR-160 is in the first phase of a Canadian Nuclear Safety Commission pre-licensing review.

In 2022, the company asked for a "USD 7.4 billion federal loan to enable it to increase capacity for SMR production at its existing manufacturing facilities, to construct and operate four SMR-160s in the USA and to build a new Holtec Heavy Industries (HHI) complex for higher capacity manufacturing of components and modules for SMR-160s."

References

External links

 Holtec SMR-160 at US NRC

Nuclear fuel companies
Companies based in Palm Beach County, Florida
1986 establishments in New Jersey
Camden, New Jersey